Heteropsis ochracea is a butterfly in the family Nymphalidae. It is found in Angola, where it is only known from the central plateau.

References

Elymniini
Butterflies described in 1906
Endemic fauna of Angola
Butterflies of Africa